The Harrisburg Housing Authority (HHA) maintains the Public Housing Program for the City of Harrisburg, Pennsylvania. HHA owns and manages 1,738 public housing units in eight separate communities: three high-rise towers for the elderly and five family communities. Additionally, the Scattered Site program facilitates 80 more family housing residences throughout the city. The U.S. Department of Housing and Urban Development also funds HHA's Housing Choice Voucher (HCV) Program, which maintains 1,200 vouchers in the area to promote more options for living.

List of communities
 William Howard Day Homes
 Hoverter Homes
 Hall Manor
 Hillside Village
 MW Smith Homes
 Jackson Tower (elderly only)
 Lick Tower (elderly only)
 Morrison Tower (elderly only)

References

Government agencies established in 1938
Public housing in Pennsylvania